Presidential elections were held in Ivory Coast on 22 October 1995. They were boycotted by the main opposition parties, the Ivorian Popular Front and the Rally of the Republicans, in protest of new electoral rules that the opposition deemed unfair.  Presidential candidates were required to have been born of two Ivorian parents, and to have been resident in the country for the previous five years.  These provisions appeared to have been aimed at the RDR's intended candidate, former Prime Minister Alassane Ouattara.  He had been in the United States since 1990 while working for the International Monetary Fund, and there had been longstanding rumors that his father had been born in Burkina Faso.

Incumbent Henri Konan Bédié thus faced only one opponent, Francis Wodié of the tiny Ivorian Workers Party.  As President of the National Assembly, Bédié had served as interim president since the death of the country's founding leader, Félix Houphouët-Boigny, in 1993. Bédié was re-elected with 96.44% of the vote.

Results
The Constitutional Court annulled 143,845 of the 2,109,490 votes cast.

References

Ivory
1995 in Ivory Coast
Presidential elections in Ivory Coast